Pyrausta subflavalis is a moth in the family Crambidae. It was described by Warren in 1892. It is found in Ethiopia, Kenya, Madagascar and Zimbabwe.

References

Moths described in 1892
subflavalis
Moths of Africa